Inguraidhoo (Dhivehi: އިނގުރައިދޫ) is one of the inhabited islands of Raa Atoll, Maldives.

Geography

Demography

References

Islands of the Maldives